London Buses route 242 is a Transport for London contracted bus route in London, England. Running between Homerton University Hospital and Aldgate bus station, it is operated by Arriva London. In December 1998, it became the first double-decker route in London to solely use low-floor buses.

History
 
Route 242 was introduced in February 1998 between Homerton University Hospital and Tottenham Court Road station, replacing routes 22A and 22B.

In December 1998, the introduction of Alexander ALX400 bodied DAF DB250 buses on the route made it the first double-decker route in London to solely use accessible, low-floor buses. 

In 2004 it became a 24-hour service with night bus route N242 services that followed the same route renumbered 242. The route of the bus was criticised by London Assembly members for its use of narrow streets.

In 2017, the route was diverted to terminate at St Paul's, before being cut back on 15 June 2019 to Aldgate bus station with a service frequency reduction. The diversion to Aldgate was criticised for the reduction in access to the City of London and St Bartholomew's Hospital for residents. The reduction in service frequency was criticised for its impacts on the deprived Clapton Park Estate, an area only served by the route.

The night route continues to serve Tottenham Court Road station, and from 15 June 2019 was renumbered route N242.

Upon being re-tendered in 2002, 2009 and 2016, the route was retained by Arriva London.

Current route
Route 242 operates via these primary locations:
Homerton University Hospital
Clapton Square
Hackney Central station 
Dalston Junction station bus station  
Haggerston station 
Hoxton station / Museum of the Home 
Shoreditch High Street station 
Aldgate East station 
Aldgate bus station

Previous use
The historic route 242 ran between Potters Bar and Waltham Abbey, operated by London Transport. Following privatisation in the late 1980s, the route is now run by Metroline as a commercial operation, as the route is outside of the Transport for London area.

References

External links

Bus routes in London
Transport in the London Borough of Hackney
Transport in the London Borough of Tower Hamlets
Transport in the City of London